Ramin (also Romanized as Rāmīn; also known as Dāmīn, Iraman, and Rahmīn) is a village in Mojezat Rural District, in the Central District of Zanjan County, Zanjan Province, Iran. At the 2006 census, its population was 1,078, in 236 families.

References 

Populated places in Zanjan County